There are different types of fictional dwarves appearing in American comic books published by Marvel Comics. The most common of the Dwarves are the ones that are based on the dwarves of Norse mythology. They frequently appear in stories featuring the superhero Thor.

History

Dwarves of Weirdworld
There are a race of dwarves that reside in Weirdworld. The Elf Tyndall of Klarn once lived with a warren of Dwarves who were besieged by the Night-Fangers. They sent him on a quest where Tyndall encountered the newly hatched Velanna.

Tyndall and Velanna later met the dwarf thief Mud-Butt who later became their ally.

Dwarves of Asgard
The Dwarves were smaller in stature than the Asgardians and had squat, stocky bodies. Their average height was four feet. They were stronger and faster than they appeared to be, with fighting skills allowing them to take down larger opponents. The Dwarves tended to be craftsmen and farmers who maintained friendly trade and peace relations with the Gods of Asgard, even though they were also known for sending minor Asgardians to the Trolls as slaves. Dwarves dwell in the realm of Nidavellir one of the Nine Worlds of Norse mythology. Nidavellir was part of the landmass where Asgard, Alfheim, and Vanaheim were all situated. Dwarves crafted such legendary Asgardian weapons as Thor's hammer Mjolnir and Odin's spear Gungnir. Although it was the magic of Odin that imbued Mjolnir and Gugnir with their special enchantments. Dwarves are the race that have crafted most of the weapons and enchanted items for the gods.

Thor arrives at the workshop of King Sindri of the dwarves, where he is given a magical boat to carry him on a special mission for his father Odin. The boat is small enough to fit in a pocket, but grows to full size and flies if needed. Seeking cover from a raging storm, Thor asks King Sindri of the Dwarves to provide him shelter. The Dwarves requiring to provide another slave to the Trolls as payment to avoid their kingdom being attacked and they drop Thor down into the pit of the Trolls unaware of who he was.

Thor and Odin called upon the services of the Dwarves where they crafted Stormbreaker for Beta Ray Bill so that he can fight off the demons that are plaguing the Korbonites.<ref name="Thor #339">Thor No. 339. Marvel Comics.</ref>

At the time when Storm and the New Mutants were in Asgard, Cannonball ended up underground in the Dwarves' territory where he finds it under siege by some Rock Trolls. After he is stabbed in the back while saving Eitri's wife, he is healed following the battle and is welcomed as a true friend to the Dwarves. The Dwarves are then attacked by the Dark Elves and a warped Magma.

During the "Fear Itself" storyline, Iron Man pleads with Odin to let him use his workshops to make weapons for his Avengers in order to fight the Serpent and the Worthy. Odin grants him access to Svartalfheim in Asgard where he meets Splitlip who agrees to help Iron Man make new weapons. As Iron Man concludes that he needs to place his armor into the Uru in order to enhance it, he and the Dwarves are attacked by a Golem that was made by the Serpent's followers called the Smoke Elves. When the Golem is leeching off of Iron Man's armor, the Dwarves help Iron Man to defeat the Golem. While Iron Man prepares to take the Asgardian weapons to his allies, Splitlip and his Dwarves are given the approval to have Iron Man dispose of the captive Smoke Elves. Iron Man then gives the Smoke Elves the choice of either being dealt with by the Dwarves or taking their leave. The Smoke Elves choose to take their leave.

Known Dwarves
Dwarves of Weirdworld
 Mud-Butt – 
 Perna –

Dwarves of Asgard
 Brokk – A Dwarf blacksmith and brother of Eitri who took part in forging Mjolnir.
 Eitri – The King of the Dwarves who is a master blacksmith.
 Kamorr – A Dwarf who is a servant and personal friend of Heimdall.
 Kindra – A Dwarf who is the daughter of Eitri.
 Screwbeard – A Dwarf who is a member of the League of Realms.
 Sindri – Sindri was the King of the Dwarves during Thor's youth.
 Splitlip – The Dwarven Master of Nidavellir.
 Throgg – A Dwarf blacksmith.
 Tooth – A Dwarf who worked at Nidavellir.

In other media
The Dwarves of Asgard appear in The Avengers: Earth's Mightiest Heroes episode "The Fall of Asgard".
The Dwarves of Asgard appear in Avengers: Infinity War. When Thor, Rocket, and Groot arrive on Nidavellir, they find Eitri, who informs them that Thanos killed most of the Dwarves after they forged the Infinity Gauntlet.
The Dwarves of Asgard appear in Thor: The Dark World - The Official Game.
The Dwarves of Asgard appear in "The Avengers: The Avengers Initiative", a comic book prequel to The Avengers''.

References

External links
 Dwarves of Nidavellir at Marvel Wiki

Fictional dwarves